The 1984 Virginia Slims of Boston was a women's tennis tournament played on indoor carpet courts at the Walter Brown Arena in Boston, Massachusetts in the United States that was part of the 1984 Virginia Slims World Championship Series. The tournament was held from March 26 through April 1, 1984. Fourth-seeded Hana Mandlíková won the singles title.

Finals

Singles
 Hana Mandlíková defeated  Helena Suková 7–5, 6–0
 It was Mandlíková's 5th singles title of the year and the 21st of her career.

Doubles
 Barbara Potter /  Sharon Walsh defeated  Andrea Leand /  Mary-Lou Daniels 7–6, 6–0
 It was Potter's 2nd title of the year and the 17th of her career. It was Walsh's 3rd title of the year and the 27th of her career.

External links
 ITF tournament edition details
 Tournament draws

Virginia Slims of Boston
Virginia Slims of Boston
1984 in sports in Massachusetts
Virgin